The men's team competition with a free system was an artistic gymnastics event held as part of the Gymnastics at the 1912 Summer Olympics programme. It was one of three team gymnastics events.  The others were a team competition in the Swedish system and a standard team competition.

It was the first appearance of the event, which would only be held again at the 1920 Summer Olympics. The official name was Team Competition III – with free choice of movements and apparatus. For every nation one team was allowed to participate. One team had to consist of not less than 16 nor more than 40 members. The entry was closed on June 6, 1912. As all other gymnastics competitions the event took place in the Olympiastadion.

The competition was held on Wednesday July 10, 1912, in the time from 9:30 a.m. to 12:30 p.m. and from 2:00 p.m. to 4:00 p.m.

Starting order

Results

Judges

Chief Leader: Einar Nerman

Scores are an average of five judges' marks.

Score board

Three judges saw the first place for Norway, while one judge gave the first place to Denmark and one to Finland. Germany was placed behind Luxembourg by four judges and only the German judge gave his compatriots more points than Luxembourg – enough to beat the small neighbour, but not enough to win a medal.

Final standings

References

Sources
 
 

Gymnastics at the 1912 Summer Olympics